"Begin Again" is a song by English band Space, released in June 1998. The song charted at number 21 on the UK Singles Chart the same month. In Australia, "Begin Again" entered the ARIA Singles Chart on 27 July 1998 at number 82, its peak.

Track listings
UK CD1 
 "Begin Again" (radio edit)
 "You Romantic Fool"
 "Numb the Doubt"
 "Influenza" (Flu mix)

UK CD2 
 "Begin Again" (radio edit)
 "The Ballad of Tom Jones" (raw and live from Wolverhampton Civic Hall with Cerys Matthew, 1998)
 "Female of the Species" (raw and live from Wolverhampton Civic Hall, 1998)
 "Spiders" (raw and live from Wolverhampton Civic Hall, 1998)

UK cassette single 
 "Begin Again" (radio edit)
 "You Romantic Fool"
 "Numb the Doubt"

Australian CD single 
 "Begin Again" (radio edit)
 "The Ballad of Tom Jones"
 "Avenging Angels"
 "The Ballad of Tom Jones" (live)
 "Avenging Angels" (live)

Charts

References

External links
"Begin Again" article

1998 singles
1998 songs
Black-and-white music videos
Space (English band) songs